The 822d Air Division is an inactive United States Air Force organization.  Its last assignment was with Strategic Air Command (SAC) at Turner Air Force Base, Georgia, where it was inactivated on 2 September 1966.

The division was formed to command four strategic wings that were formed in the Southeastern United States as part of SAC's program to disperse its B-52 force to minimize attrition from a possible Soviet first strike.  Once the division's wings were organized and equipped, they maintained a portion of their aircraft on airborne and ground alert. During the Cuban Missile Crisis, all combat aircraft of the division were placed on increased alert status. In addition to its SAC mission, the division's wing at Eglin Air Force Base, Florida was involved in testing armament for the Boeing B-52 Stratofortress.

The division was inactivated in 1966 as SAC began to withdraw its older B-52s from operational service.

History

As Strategic Air Command (SAC) began to equip with the Boeing B-52 Stratofortress, it was concerned that bases with large concentrations of the new jet bombers made attractive targets.  SAC's response was to break up its B-52 wings and scatter their aircraft over a larger number of bases, thus making it more difficult for the Soviet Union to knock out the entire fleet with a surprise first strike.  In 1959, Tactical Air Command (TAC) was in the process of withdrawing its fighters from Turner Air Force Base, which had been a SAC fighter aircraft and reconnaissance base until the spring of 1957.  On 1 January 1959, SAC resumed control of Turner and activated the 822d Air Division and 4138th Strategic Wing to prepare Turner for the arrival of SAC heavy bombers and tankers.  The 4134th Strategic Wing at Eglin Air Force Base, Florida and the 4241st Strategic Wing at Seymour Johnson Air Force Base, North Carolina, both of which had been organized a few months earlier, were also assigned to the division when it activated. Six months later, the 4137th Strategic Wing at  Robins Air Force Base, Georgia was organized and assigned to the 822d.  None of these bases had served as heavy bomber locations before, and only Turner belonged to SAC.  Eglin was an Air Force Systems Command base, Seymour Johnson was a TAC base, and Robins was an Air Force Logistics Command base.

However, the establishment of wings did not immediately disperse the bomber force.  Although the 73d Bombardment Squadron moved to Seymour Johnson from Ramey Air Force Base, Puerto Rico five days after the division activated, it was not until summer that the wings at Turner and  Eglin were able to activate their B-52 squadrons, and the 342d Bombardment Squadron did not move to Robins from Blytheville Air Force Base, Arkansas until May 1960.  By February 1960, all wings except for the 4137th were combat ready.  The B-52 squadron moves were paper moves only, and each unit began to equip and train with the Stratofortress from scratch.   It would be the end of December 1960 before all the division's squadrons were fully equipped.  As their squadrons became combat ready, one third of each wing's aircraft were maintained on fifteen-minute alert, fully fueled, armed and ready for combat to reduce vulnerability to a Soviet missile strike.  This was increased to half their aircraft in 1962.

The division conducted long range bombardment training missions from activation through inactivation.   Because of its location at Eglin Air Force Base, home of the Air Poriving Ground Center, the 4135th wing (and later the 39th) would be involved with operational testing of weapons for the B-52.  One of the first of these was the GAM-77 Hound Dog missile, which would eventually equip all four of the division's wings.  The 4135th wing was flying borrowed B-52s even before its 301st Bombardment Squadron was assigned, with Hound Dog testing as its initial mission. The division conducted numerous staff assistance visits and monitored tactical exercises, including Operation Chrome Dome, B-52 airborne alert operations.

On 20 October 1962, at the start of the Cuban Missile Crisis, each of the division's wings were directed to put two additional B-52s on alert.  Two days later 1/8 of the B-52s were placed on airborne alert.  Additional division KC-135s were placed on alert to replace KC-135s devoted to maintaining the increased B-52 bomber force on airborne alert.  On 24 October SAC went to DEFCON 2, placing all aircraft on alert.  This posture was maintained until 21 November, when SAC returned to its normal airborne alert status and assumed DEFCON 3, but the 822d maintained an increased number of bombers and tankers on ground alert for another week.

The division's three strategic wings were Major Command controlled (MAJCON) units that could not carry a permanent history or lineage. SAC received authority from Headquarters USAF to discontinue them and activate Air Force controlled (AFCON) units to replace them without altering their missions.  On 1 February 1963, the 39th Bombardment Wing replaced the 4135th at Eglin, the 68th Bombardment Wing replaced the 4241st at Seymour Johnson the 465th Bombardment Wing replaced the 4137th at Robins, and the 484th Bombardment Wing replaced the 4138th at Turner.  Each of the new wings absorbed the personnel and aircraft of their predecessors.

In June 1965, the 39th Bombardment Wing was inactivated and its bombers moved to Barksdale Air Force Base, Louisiana.  The division formed Detachment 1, 822d Air Division at Eglin to wind up SAC B-52 operations there.   The division was inactivated in the fall of 1966 as Turner prepared for closure and its subordinate wings were reassigned to the 57th Air Division.  The inactivation was originally planned for July 1967, but this was accelerated with the phase out of early model B-52s from the Air Force inventory.

Lineage
 Established as the 822 Air Division on 22 August 1958
 Activated on 1 January 1959
 Discontinued and inactivated on 2 September 1966

Assignments
 Eighth Air Force, 1 January 1959 – 2 September 1966

Stations
 Turner Air Force Base, Georgia, 1 January 1959 – 2 September 1966

Components
Wings
 39th Bombardment Wing:  1 February 1963 – 25 June 1965
 Eglin Air Force Base, Florida
 68th Bombardment Wing: 15 April 1963 – 1 July 1964; 1 July 1965 – 2 September 1966
 Seymour Johnson Air Force Base, North Carolina
 465th Bombardment Wing: 1 February 1963 – 2 September 1966 (attached to 57th Air Division after 10 August 1966)
 Robins Air Force Base, Georgia
 484th Bombardment Wing: 1 February 1963 – 2 September 1966
 4135th Strategic Wing, 1 January 1959 – 1 February 1963
 Eglin Air Force Base, Florida
 4137th Strategic Wing: 1 July 1959 – 1 February 1963
 Robins Air Force Base, Georgia
 4241st Strategic Wing: 1 January 1959 – 15 April 1963
 Seymour Johnson Air Force Base, North Carolina
 4138 Strategic Wing: 1 January 1959 – 1 February 1963

Aircraft and missiles 
 Boeing B-52 Stratofortress, 1959–1966
 Boeing KC-135 Stratotanker, 1959–1964, 1965–1966
 North American GAM-77 (later AGM-28) Hound Dog, 1960–1966
 GAM-72 Quail (later ADM-22), c. 1962–1966

Commanders
 Col William E. Ruark Jr., 1 January 1959
 Brig Gen Austin J. Russell, 7 January 1959
 Brig Gen Jack J. Catton, 10 July 1961
 Brig Gen Woodrow P. Swancutt, 30 June 1962 – unknown

See also
 List of United States Air Force air divisions
 List of USAF Bomb Wings and Wings assigned to Strategic Air Command
 List of USAF Strategic Wings assigned to the Strategic Air Command
 List of B-52 Units of the United States Air Force

References

Notes

Bibliography

 
 
 
 
 

Units and formations of Strategic Air Command
Air divisions of the United States Air Force
Military units and formations of the United States in the Cold War
1959 establishments in Georgia (U.S. state)
1966 disestablishments in Georgia (U.S. state)